Jonathan Simpkin (born 28 October 1987) is a former professional Australian rules footballer who played for the Geelong Football Club, Hawthorn Football Club and Essendon Football Club in the Australian Football League (AFL).

AFL career

Sydney
Originally from Colac, Victoria, Simpkin was first rookie listed by the Sydney Swans with the 16th selection in the 2006 AFL Rookie Draft after playing junior football for the Geelong Falcons in the TAC Cup.  Simpkin spend the 2006 and 2007 season playing for the Sydney Swans reserves team that won the 2006 and 2007 AFL Canberra premierships. Despite being elevated to their senior list for the 2007 season, he was delisted by the Swans at the end of the 2007 season without having played in the AFL. He trained for a period late in 2007 with  but was not drafted to their squad.

Geelong
He returned to play for the Colac Tigers in the Geelong Football League.  
During 2008 he also managed to play 8 games for Geelong in the Victorian Football League (VFL) on permits. In 2009, he was a full-time member of the Geelong  (VFL) squad and in 2010 he represented the VFL against WAFL. In December 2010 in the 2011 Rookie Draft he was then selected by Geelong.  He continued to play for Geelong in the VFL and despite performing well consistently throughout the season, winning the team's best and fairest award, he was unable to break into the AFL side.

Prior to round 9 of the 2012 AFL season, Simpkin was promoted off the rookie list as a replacement for Nathan Vardy.  He then made his debut against , coming on as the substitute player at three-quarter time.
Simpkin again won the Geelong (VFL) best and fairest award in 2012 and also was part of the winning Geelong (VFL) premiership side the same year. Geelong had to reduce the number of rookies from six to four because of new AFL rules, so they decided not to re-new his contract and that he became eligible to be on the AFL Delisted Free Agency list.

Hawthorn
Hawthorn secured former  rookie Jonathan Simpkin during the 2012 AFL Delisted Free Agency Period.

He played his first game for Hawthorn against  in Adelaide, South Australia, in round six 2013 and finished the season with 13 games. Owing to injury to Brendan Whitecross  he was selected for Hawthorn's grand final team and was subbed on at three quarter time winning a premiership medal when the Hawks defeated Fremantle, in his first season at the club. He also played in Box Hill's VFL premiership team winning the Norm Goss Memorial Medal for his best on ground performance that day.

Simpkin played only one AFL game for Hawthorn in 2015 (a round 7 win over Melbourne) and he was delisted In October.

Essendon
In January 2016, Simpkin signed with the Essendon Football Club as a "top-up" player due to the supplements controversy.

Statistics

|- style=background:#EAEAEA
| 2006 ||  || 29
| 0 || — || — || — || — || — || — || — || — || — || — || — || — || — || — || 0
|-
| 2007 ||  || 29
| 0 || — || — || — || — || — || — || — || — || — || — || — || — || — || — || 0
|- style=background:#EAEAEA
| 2011 ||  || 46
| 0 || — || — || — || — || — || — || — || — || — || — || — || — || — || — || 0
|-
| 2012 ||  || 46
| 4 || 1 || 0 || 22 || 13 || 35 || 8 || 7 || 0.3 || 0.0 || 5.5 || 3.3 || 8.8 || 2.0 || 1.8 || 0
|- style=background:#EAEAEA
| bgcolor=F0E68C | 2013# ||  || 32
| 14 || 6 || 5 || 123 || 104 || 227 || 49 || 31 || 0.4 || 0.4 || 8.8 || 7.4 || 16.2 || 3.5 || 2.2 || 0
|-
| 2014 ||  || 32
| 18 || 9 || 5 || 152 || 139 || 291 || 66 || 39 || 0.5 || 0.3 || 8.4 || 7.7 || 16.2 || 3.7 || 2.2 || 1
|- style=background:#EAEAEA
| 2015 ||  || 32
| 1 || 0 || 0 || 3 || 4 || 7 || 2 || 2 || 0.0 || 0.0 || 3.0 || 4.0 || 7.0 || 2.0 || 2.0 || 0
|-
| 2016 ||  || 52
| 4 || 1 || 0 || 33 || 41 || 74 || 13 || 6 || 0.3 || 0.0 || 8.3 || 10.3 || 18.5 || 3.3 || 1.5 || 0
|- class="sortbottom"
! colspan=3| Career
! 41 !! 17 !! 10 !! 333 !! 301 !! 634 !! 138 !! 85 !! 0.4 !! 0.2 !! 8.1 !! 7.3 !! 15.5 !! 3.4 !! 2.1 !! 1
|}

Honours and achievements
Team
 AFL premiership player: 2013
 Minor premiership: 2013
 VFL premiership player (Geelong VFL): 2012
 VFL premiership player (Box Hill): 2013
 Minor premiership (Box Hill): 2015

Individual
 Norm Goss Memorial Medal: 2013
 2× Geelong (VFL) best and fairest: 2011, 2012
 Col Austen Trophy: 2015

References

External links

1987 births
Living people
Australian rules footballers from Victoria (Australia)
Essendon Football Club players
Geelong Football Club players
Geelong Falcons players
Hawthorn Football Club players
Hawthorn Football Club Premiership players
Box Hill Football Club players
People from Colac, Victoria
One-time VFL/AFL Premiership players